Can of Worms was an Australian television talk show, broadcast on Network Ten, first screening on 4 July 2011 until 20 May 2013. Ian "Dicko" Dickson hosted the first series along with Meshel Laurie.

The second series, was hosted by Chrissie Swan and 'man on the street' Dan Ilic, began airing on 20 August 2012, with two 'Best of Specials' airing in November as a two-part finale. The Third Series (still hosted by Swan and Ilic) begun airing on 11 February 2013 and was broadcast  live. James Mathison hosted the show whilst Swan was on maternity leave.

The program features a panel of three public figures, answering questions issues that affect people every day involving political correctness, personal values and the unending capacity to make life complicated. The program is recorded live in front of a studio audience and broadcast on the following night. The show is produced by Andrew Denton and Zapruder's Other Films.

On 23 October 2012, Can of Worms was renewed for a third series that would be broadcast around the nation live.

Season 1 was filmed at Global Television Studios at the Australian Technology Park in Eveleigh, Sydney. Season 2 moved produced to ABC Studios in Ultimo, Sydney. Season 3 moved production interstate to Melbourne, using studio facilities at the ABC in Elsternwick.

Format
Most of the show revolves around the two "worms" of the evening. After three celebrity guests are introduced, the first "worm" is introduced and the guests may choose to respond "Yes" or "No". The guests are asked questions about their response to the worm. The focus is on the studio audience and talks to a few of the members of the audience about their experiences and beliefs in relation to the worm. Afterwards there is results of a Roy Morgan poll of the "worm". The following segment called "Moral Minefield" is similar but a shorter version. There are six categories (two per guest) each of which has a question (similar to a "worm", but not referred to as such). After picking one of the categories, the guest must answer truthfully, and see if it agrees with the studio audiences majority vote. The second "worm" is run similar to the first.

The show encourages widespread discussion via social media. Viewers can post views by Tweeting using @CanofwormsTV or a specified hashtag, or posting onto the Can of Worms Facebook page. During the discussion of the "worms", Tweets and Facebook posts are included at the bottom of the screen.

Worms
"Worms" are yes/no questions about morals, society, responsible parenting, religion, race and various other topics. In each episode, two "worms" are announced and discussed; although this was phased out during the latter half of season 2 and as of early season 3 there is only one major worm with audience participation and 'live' Facebook/ Zeebox Australia feeds.

References

Network 10 original programming
Australian television talk shows
Australian non-fiction television series
2011 Australian television series debuts
2013 Australian television series endings
English-language television shows